Ampulla is a genus of sea snails, marine gastropod mollusks in the family Volutidae.

Species
Species within the genus Ampulla include:

 Ampulla priamus (Gmelin, 1791)

References

Volutidae
Monotypic gastropod genera